Braeriach or Brae Riach ('the brindled upland') is the third-highest mountain in Scotland and all of the British Isles, after Ben Nevis and Ben Macdui, rising  above sea level. It is in the Scottish Highlands and is the highest point in the western massif of the Cairngorms, separated from the central section by the Lairig Ghru pass. The summit is a crescent-shaped plateau, overlooking several corries. 

The lingering snows of Braeriach are amongst the most persistent snow patches in Scotland and the whole British Isles. The north-facing corrie of Garbh Coire Mor has been snow-free just nine times in the last one hundred years: 1933, 1959, 1996, 2003, 2006, 2017, 2018, 2021 and 2022 – but four times in the six years to 2022. The rate and occurrence of melting appears to be increasing.

Probably the most commonly used route up Braeriach starts from Sugar Bowl car park, on the road leading to the Cairn Gorm ski area. After crossing this pass the route heads for the summit via Braeriach's north ridge, crossing a subsidiary peak, Sròn na Lairige.

See also
 List of Munro mountains
 Mountains and hills of Scotland

References 

Badenoch and Strathspey
Marr
Munros
Marilyns of Scotland
Mountains and hills of the Cairngorms
Mountains and hills of Highland (council area)
Mountains and hills of Aberdeenshire
Places and place names on Mar Lodge Estate
One-thousanders of Scotland